Chip Bennett is an NFL player. He played college football for Abilene Christian University, and professionally with the Cincinnati Bengals.

References

American football linebackers